Hugh Irvine Wilson (November 13, 1879 - February 3, 1925) was a golf course designer. He is most famous for designing Merion Golf Club, consistently ranked among the top golf courses in the USA. Wilson also finished the last four holes at the famous Pine Valley Golf Club.

Wilson, along with A.W. Tillinghast, George C. Thomas, Jr., William Flynn, George Crump, and William Fownes together made up the "Philadelphia School" of golf course architecture. Together, the group designed over 300 courses, 27 of which are on in the top 100 golf courses in the world.

Career
Wilson was born in Trenton, New Jersey to Lt. Col. William Potter Wilson & Ellen Stover Dickson Wilson and was very talented at golf. A Princeton University freshman at 18, he won the first course championship at Aronimink Golf Club in Philadelphia, Pennsylvania. After being chosen to design Merion Golf Club in 1911, he spent seven months in Scotland and England in 1910 developing ideas. He admitted that many concepts built into the Merion design came from this trip, including the 3rd hole on the East course being inspired by North Berwick Golf Club's 15th and 17th holes.

Courses designed
The following courses were designed by Hugh Wilson:

Public
 Cobbs Creek Golf Club (Olde Course) - Philadelphia, Pennsylvania
 Seaview Marriott Resort (Bay Course) - Absecon, New Jersey - Work did not include placement of bunkers.

Private
 Merion Golf Club (East Course) - Ardmore, Pennsylvania
 Merion Golf Club (West Course) - Ardmore, Pennsylvania
 Phoenixville Country Club (9 holes) - Phoenixville, Pennsylvania

References

Golf course architects
American landscape architects
Scottish emigrants to the United States
1879 births
1925 deaths